Indu Banga is an Indian historian who specializes in the history of Punjab. She works at the Department of History of Panjab University, Chandigarh.

Books
 Agrarian System of the Sikhs: Late Eighteenth and Early Nineteenth Century (1978)
 The City in Indian History: Urban Demography, Society, and Politics (1991)
 Ports and their hinterlands in India, 1700-1950 (1992)
 Punjab in prosperity and violence: administration, politics, and social change, 1947-1997 (1998)
 History and Ideology: The Khalsa Over 300 Years (1999)
 Lala Lajpat Rai in Retrospect: Political, Economic, Social, and Cultural Concerns (2000)

References

Indian women historians
Living people
20th-century Indian historians
Women educators from Chandigarh
Educators from Chandigarh
20th-century Indian women scientists
20th-century Indian scientists
20th-century women writers
Year of birth missing (living people)